The 2019 All-Big 12 Conference football team consists of American football players chosen as All-Big 12 Conference players for the 2019 Big 12 Conference football season.  The conference recognizes two official All-Big 12 selectors: (1) the Big 12 conference coaches selected separate offensive and defensive units and named first- and second-team players (the "Coaches" team); and (2) a panel of sports writers and broadcasters covering the Big 12 also selected offensive and defensive units and named first- and second-team players (the "Media" team).

Offensive selections

Quarterbacks

 Jalen Hurts, Oklahoma (Coaches-1; Media-1)
 Brock Purdy, Iowa State (Coaches-2; Media-2)

Running backs

 Chuba Hubbard, Oklahoma State (Coaches-1; Media-1)
 Pooka Williams Jr., Kansas (Coaches-1; Media-1)
 Kennedy Brooks, Oklahoma (Coaches-2; Media-2)
 Breece Hall, Iowa State (Coaches-2; Media-2)

Fullbacks

 Nick Lenners, Kansas State (Coaches-1)
 Koby Bullard, Baylor (Coaches-2)

Centers

 Creed Humphrey, Oklahoma (Coaches-1; Media-1)
 Zach Shackelford, Texas (Coaches-1; Media-2)

Guards

 Sam Tecklenburg, Baylor (Coaches-2; Media-1)
 Marcus Keyes, Oklahoma State (Media-1)
 Parker Braun, Texas (Media-2)
 Josh Rivas, Kansas State (Media-2)

Tackles

 Julian Good-Jones, Iowa State (Coaches-1; Media-1)
 Colton McKivitz, West Virginia (Coaches-1; Media-1)
 Hakeem Adeniji, Kansas (Coaches-1; Media-2)
 Sam Cosmi, Texas (Coaches-2; Media-2)
 Adrian Ealy, Oklahoma (Coaches-2)
 Travis Bruffy, Texas Tech (Coaches-2)
 Scott Frantz, Kansas State (Coaches-2)

Tight ends

 Charlie Kolar, Iowa State (Coaches-1; Media-1)
 Pro Wells, TCU (Coaches-2; Media-2)
 Chase Allen, Iowa State (Media-2)

Receivers

 Devin Duvernay, Texas (Coaches-1; Media-1)
 CeeDee Lamb, Oklahoma (Coaches-1; Media-1)
 Denzel Mims, Baylor (Coaches-1; Media-2)
 Tylan Wallace, Oklahoma State (Coaches-2; Media-2)
 Deshaunte Jones, Iowa State (Coaches-2)
 Jeremiah Hall, Oklahoma (Coaches-2)
 Jalen Reagor, TCU (Coaches-2)

Defensive selections

Defensive linemen
 Wyatt Hubert, Kansas State (Coaches-1; Media-1)
 James Lynch, Baylor (Coaches-1; Media-1)
 Bravvion Roy, Baylor (Coaches-1; Media-1)
 Ross Blacklock, TCU (Coaches-1; Media-2)
 Neville Gallimore, Oklahoma (Coaches-2; Media-1)
 Darius Stills, West Virginia (Coaches-1; Media-2)
 Ronnie Perkins, Oklahoma (Coaches-2; Media-2)
 Eli Howard, Texas Tech (Coaches-2)
 Ray Lima, Iowa State (Coaches-2)
 Malcolm Roach, Texas (Media-2)
 Dante Stills, West Virginia (Coaches-2)

Linebackers

 Jordyn Brooks, Texas Tech (Coaches-1; Media-1)
 Kenneth Murray, Oklahoma (Coaches-1; Media-1)
 Garret Wallow, TCU (Coaches-1; Media-1)
 Terrel Bernard, Baylor (Coaches-2; Media-2)
 Clay Johnston, Baylor (Coaches-2; Media-2)
 Amen Ogbongbemiga, Oklahoma State (Coaches-2)
 Malcolm Rodriguez, Oklahoma State (Coaches-2)
 Marcel Spears Jr., Iowa State (Media-2)

Defensive backs

 Jeff Gladney, TCU (Coaches-1; Media-1)
 Kolby Harvell-Peel, Oklahoma State (Coaches-1; Media-1)
 Trevon Moehrig, TCU (Coaches-1; Media-1)
 Douglas Coleman, Texas Tech (Coaches-1; Media-2)
 Parnell Motley, Oklahoma (Coaches-2; Media-1)
 Greg Eisworth, Iowa State (Coaches-1)
 Grayland Arnold, Baylor (Coaches-2; Media-2)
 Keith Washington, West Virginia (Coaches-2; Media-2)
 A. J. Green, Oklahoma State (Media-2)
 Brandon Jones, Texas (Coaches-2)
 Chris Miller, Baylor (Coaches-2)
 Josh Norwood, West Virginia (Coaches-2)

Special teams

Kickers

 Jonathan Song, TCU (Coaches-1; Media-1)
 Gabe Brkic, Oklahoma (Coaches-2; Media-2)

Punters

 Austin McNamara, Texas Tech (Coaches-1; Media-1)
 Devin Anctil, Kansas State (Coaches-2; Media-2)

All-purpose / Return specialists

 Joshua Youngblood, Kansas State (Coaches-1; Media-1)
 Jalen Reagor, TCU (Coaches-2; Media-2)

Key
Bold = selected as a first-team player by both the coaches and media panel

Coaches = selected by Big 12 Conference coaches

Media = selected by a media panel

See also
2019 College Football All-America Team

References

All-Big 12 Conference
All-Big 12 Conference football teams